The 1923 Portsmouth South by-election was a parliamentary by-election held in England on 13 August 1923 to elect a new Member of Parliament (MP) for the House of Commons constituency of Portsmouth South in Hampshire.

Vacancy 
The seat had become vacant when the constituency's Conservative MP Leslie Orme Wilson had been appointed as Governor of Bombay, and had therefore resigned from the Commons on 26 July by the procedural device of accepting appointment as Steward of the Manor of Northstead. Wilson had held the seat for less than a year, having won it at a by-election in December 1922. He had previously been the MP for Reading from 1913 to 1922.

Electoral history
The result at the last election was

Candidates

The Conservative candidate was Herbert Cayzer, who had held the seat from the 1918 general election until his resignation on 27 November 1922, only two weeks after being returned at the general election in November 1922.
The Liberal Party candidate was 64-year-old retired army general, Sir Henry Lawson, who had previously contested the seat unsuccessfully at the 1922 general election.

Campaign

Result

Aftermath
Cayzer was re-elected for Portsmouth South at the next five general elections, and held the seat until he was ennobled in 1939. Lawson never stood for Parliament again. The result at the following general election;

See also 
 Portsmouth South (UK Parliament constituency)
 1922 Portsmouth South by-election
 1939 Portsmouth South by-election
 1984 Portsmouth South by-election
 The city of Portsmouth
 List of United Kingdom by-elections

References 

Portsmouth South by-election
Portsmouth South by-election
Portsmouth South by-election
By-elections to the Parliament of the United Kingdom in Hampshire constituencies
Elections in Portsmouth
20th century in Hampshire